Daniel Huňa (born 25 June 1979) is a former professional Czech football player. He played over 100 games in the Czech First League for 1. FK Příbram.

After six and a half years at Příbram, where he was captain, he joined FK Bohemians Praha (Střížkov) on loan in June 2011.

References

External links
 
 

1979 births
Living people
Sportspeople from Most (city)
Czech footballers
Czech First League players
Bohemians 1905 players
1. FK Příbram players
FK Bohemians Prague (Střížkov) players
FK Baník Most players
Association football forwards